"Jumpin' Jack Flash" is a song by the English rock band the Rolling Stones, released as a non-album single in 1968. Called "supernatural Delta blues by way of Swinging London" by Rolling Stone magazine, the song was perceived by some as the band's return to their blues roots after the baroque pop and psychedelia heard on their preceding albums Aftermath (1966) (which did feature some blues songs), Between the Buttons (1967) and especially Their Satanic Majesties Request (1967). One of the group's most popular and recognisable songs, it has featured in films and been covered by numerous performers, notably Thelma Houston, Aretha Franklin, Tina Turner, Peter Frampton, Johnny Winter, Leon Russell and Alex Chilton. To date, it is the band's most-performed song: they have played it over 1,100 times in concert.

It is one of their most popular songs, and it is on Rolling Stones 500 Greatest Songs of All Time list. It is also, according to Acclaimed Music, the 77th-best-ranked song on critics' all-time lists.

Inspiration and recording
Written by Mick Jagger and Keith Richards, recording on "Jumpin' Jack Flash" began during the Beggars Banquet sessions of 1968. Regarding the song's distinctive sound, guitarist Richards has said:

Richards has stated that he and Jagger wrote the lyrics while staying at Richards' country house, when they were awoken one morning by the clumping footsteps of his gardener Jack Dyer walking past the window. Surprised, Jagger asked what it was, and Richards responded: "Oh, that's Jack – that's jumpin' Jack." The lyrics evolved from there. Humanities scholar Camille Paglia speculated that the song's lyrics might have been partly inspired by William Blake's poem "The Mental Traveller": "She binds iron thorns around his head / And pierces both his hands and feet / And cuts his heart out of his side / To make it feel both cold & heat." The main riff is similar to their song (I Can't Get No) Satisfaction. 

Jagger said in a 1995 interview with Rolling Stone that the song arose "out of all the acid of Satanic Majesties. It's about having a hard time and getting out. Just a metaphor for getting out of all the acid things." And in a 1968 interview, Brian Jones described it as "getting back to ... the funky, essential essence" following the psychedelia of Their Satanic Majesties Request.

In his autobiography Stone Alone, Bill Wyman has said that he came up with the song's distinctive main guitar riff, working on it with Brian Jones and Charlie Watts before it was ultimately credited to Jagger and Richards. In Rolling with the Stones, Wyman credits Jagger with vocals, Richards with guitar and bass guitar, Jones with guitar, Watts with drums and himself with organ on the track with producer Jimmy Miller adding backing vocals.

According to the book Keith Richards: The Biography by Victor Bockris, the line "I was born in a crossfire hurricane", was written by Richards, and refers to his being born amid the bombing and air raid sirens of Dartford, England, in 1943 during World War II.

Release and aftermath
Released on 24 May 1968 in the UK by Decca Records and on 1 June in the US by London Records, "Jumpin' Jack Flash" (backed with "Child of the Moon") was the band's first UK release in five and a half months – this marked the group's longest gap between releases in the country up to that point. A major commercial success, reached the top of the UK Singles Chart and peaked at number three in the United States. It topped the US Cashbox chart for one week and the WLS 890 Hit Parade for four weeks. Some early London Records US pressings and Decca single in the UK of the single had a technical flaw in them: at about 2:10 about halfway through the song's instrumental bridge, the speed of the master tape slows down for a moment, before coming back to speed. The first Rolling Stones album on which the song appeared was their 1969 compilation album, Through the Past, Darkly (Big Hits Vol. 2), one year after the single was released. Since then, it has appeared on numerous other Stones compilations, including Hot Rocks 1964–1971 (1971), Rolled Gold: The Very Best of the Rolling Stones (1975), Singles Collection: The London Years (1989), Forty Licks (2002), GRRR! (2012), and Stray Cats, a collection of singles and rarities included as part of The Rolling Stones in Mono box set (2016).

The Rolling Stones have played "Jumpin' Jack Flash" during every tour since its release. It is the song the band have played in concert most frequently, and has appeared on the concert albums Get Yer Ya-Ya's Out! (recorded 1969, released 1970), Love You Live (recorded 1976, released 1977), Flashpoint (recorded 1990, released 1991), Shine a Light (recorded 2006, released 2008), Hyde Park Live (2013), Totally Stripped (recorded 1995, released 2016), and Havana Moon (2016), as well as, notably, The Rolling Stones Rock and Roll Circus (recorded 1968, released 1996), featuring the only released live performance of the song with Brian Jones. Unlike most of that show, Jones is heard clearly, mixing with Richards's lead throughout the song. The intro is not usually played in concert and instead the song begins with the main riff. The open E or open D tuning of the rhythm guitar on the studio recording has also not been replicated in concert (with the possible exception of the 1968 NME awards show, no recording of which has ever surfaced). In the performance filmed for The Rolling Stones Rock and Roll Circus in December 1968, Richards used standard tuning; and ever since the band's appearance at Hyde Park on 5 July 1969, he has played it in open G tuning with a capo on the fourth fret. Richards is particularly fond of the song's main riff, often crediting it as his favorite among all of his most revered guitar riffs.

In March 2005, Q magazine placed "Jumpin' Jack Flash" at number 2 in its list of the 100 Greatest Guitar Tracks. VH1 placed it at number 65 in its show 100 Greatest Rock Songs.

It has placed in various positions on many "best of" lists including a ranking at 144 on Rolling Stones list of "The 500 Greatest Songs of All Time", 7th on their list of the band's best songs, and the 77th most celebrated song according to Acclaimed Music.

A cover version of the song was composed to serve as the final mission of the Nintendo DS rhythm game Elite Beat Agents, in which the titular protagonists use their dancing skills to rally humanity against alien invaders who plan to outlaw all forms of music.

Music video
Two promotional videos were made in May 1968: one of a live performance and another of the band lipsyncing to the studio recording. In the latter, the band members wear makeup.

Personnel
According to authors Philippe Margotin and Jean-Michel Guesdon, except where noted:The Rolling Stones Mick Jagger lead vocals, backing vocals
 Keith Richards backing vocals, acoustic guitar, bass, bass tom
 Brian Jones electric rhythm guitar
 Bill Wyman organ
 Charlie Watts drumsAdditional musicians'''
 Ian Stewart piano
 Jimmy Miller backing vocals
 Rocky Dijon maracas

Charts and certifications

Weekly charts

Year-end charts

Certifications

Aretha Franklin version

In 1986, the song's title was used for the Whoopi Goldberg film Jumpin' Jack Flash''. In addition to the Rolling Stones' version of the song, the film features Aretha Franklin's cover version in which Ronnie Wood and Richards play guitar, and Franklin plays piano. This version is characterised by influences from the popular black music scene. Only the Rolling Stones' version is on the film's original soundtrack recording.

Personnel
Aretha Franklin – lead vocals, acoustic piano
Steve Jordan – drums
Alan Rogan – guitar
Ortheia Barnes – backing vocals
Margaret Branch – backing vocals
Brenda Corbett – backing vocals
Keith Richards – lead guitar
Ronnie Wood – guitar
Randy Jackson – bass guitar
Chuck Leavell – keyboards

Charts

Notes

References

Sources

External links
 (2020 article) "The Story Behind the Song..."

1968 singles
1986 singles
The Rolling Stones songs
Decca Records singles
London Records singles
Arista Records singles
Aretha Franklin songs
Leon Russell songs
Peter Frampton songs
Guns N' Roses songs
Cashbox number-one singles
UK Singles Chart number-one singles
Number-one singles in Germany
Number-one singles in New Zealand
Songs written by Jagger–Richards
Song recordings produced by Jimmy Miller
Music videos directed by Michael Lindsay-Hogg
1968 songs
Thelma Houston songs
British hard rock songs